"Occhi di ragazza" ("Girl's eyes") was the  entry in the Eurovision Song Contest 1970, performed in Italian by Gianni Morandi.

Background 
The ballad was initially chosen by singer Ron to be presented at the 1970 Sanremo Music Festival, but was rejected by the Selection Jury. Morandi then to led it to success, and the song became a staple of his live repertoire. The song was also important for Lucio Dalla, who had composed the song's music, as its success gave him visibility and propelled his career.

At Eurovision 
The song was performed third on the night, following 's Henri Dès with "Retour" and preceding 's Eva Sršen with "Pridi, dala ti bom cvet". At the close of voting, it had received 5 points, placing it 8th in a field of 12.

It was succeeded as Italian representative at the 1971 contest by Massimo Ranieri with "L'amore è un attimo".

Charts

Cover versions 
Cover versions of the song include those by Lucio Dalla, Ron and Ornella Vanoni. An English version of the song titled "Eyes of a Child" was release by Italo-Australian performer Tony Pantano, while  recorded a Swedish version of the song titled "Någonting att minnas".

References

Eurovision songs of Italy
Eurovision songs of 1970
Gianni Morandi songs
1970 songs
Songs written by Lucio Dalla
Songs written by Sergio Bardotti